Food Recovery Network (FRN) is a student movement aimed to fight waste and feed people. It was established in 2010 by Evan Ponchick, Ben Simon, Mia Zavalij, and Cam Pascual, who were students at the University of Maryland, College Park. They noticed the amount of dining hall food being thrown away at the end of the night. They ended up diverting 30,000 meals to various agencies in the Washington, D.C.  area by the end of the school year.

Background
In 1996, the Bill Emerson Good Samaritan Food Donation Act was enacted to promote food donation in the United States. The law provides liability protection to food donors who have not acted with negligence or intentional misconduct. FRN is able to operate based on the Bill Emerson Act and has built a successful model for food recovery. Founder Cam Pascual reveals that FRN combines the following three problems to create a solution for food waste and hunger: 1) About 22 million pounds of edible food from college campuses are sent to landfills every year. 2) In the United States, one of every six Americans do not know when their next meal is coming. 3) Students in college are in need of service work.

Since FRN was founded, it has expended to 198 chapters in 44 states who have recovered over 1.6 million pounds of food.

References

External links
 Food Recovery Network - official site

Food banks in the United States